Death Valley Rangers is a 1943 American Western film directed by Robert Emmett Tansey and starring Ken Maynard, Hoot Gibson and Bob Steele.

Cast
 Ken Maynard as Ken Maynard 
 Hoot Gibson as Hoot Gibson 
 Bob Steele as Bob Steele 
 Weldon Heyburn as James Kirk 
 Linda Brent as Lorna Ainsley 
 Bryant Washburn as Edwards 
 Glenn Strange as The Marshal 
 Forrest Taylor as Captain Ainsley 
 Karl Hackett as Doc Thorne 
 Lee Roberts as Ranger Michaels 
 Charles King as Blackie - Henchman 
 George Chesebro as Red - Henchman 
 John Bridges as Stage Driver Cal Wilkins 
 Al Ferguson as Ross - Henchman 
 Steve Clark as Hank - Stage Driver 
 Wally West as Wally - Stage Guard

References

Bibliography
 Martin, Len D. The Allied Artists Checklist: The Feature Films and Short Subjects of Allied Artists Pictures Corporation, 1947-1978. McFarland & Company, 1993.

External links
 

1943 films
1943 Western (genre) films
1940s English-language films
American Western (genre) films
Films directed by Robert Emmett Tansey
Monogram Pictures films
American black-and-white films
1940s American films